Spoilers of the Forest is a 1957 American drama film directed by Joseph Kane, written by Bruce Manning, and starring Rod Cameron, Vera Ralston, Ray Collins, Hillary Brooke, Edgar Buchanan and Carl Benton Reid. It was released on April 5, 1957 by Republic Pictures.

This was the final film shot in Trucolor.

Plot

Cast       
Rod Cameron as Boyd Caldwell
Vera Ralston as Joan Milna
Ray Collins as Eric Warren
Hillary Brooke as Phyllis Warren
Edgar Buchanan as Tom Duncan
Carl Benton Reid as John Mitchell
Sheila Bromley as Linda Mitchell
Hank Worden as Pat Casey
John Compton as Billy Mitchell
John Alderson as Big Jack Milna
Angela Greene as Camille
Paul Stader as Dan
Mary Alan Hokanson as Marie Milna
Raymond Greenleaf as Clyde Walters
Eleanor Audley as Mrs. Walters

References

External links 
 

1957 films
American drama films
1957 drama films
Republic Pictures films
Films directed by Joseph Kane
Films set in forests
Films about lumberjacks
Trucolor films
1950s English-language films
1950s American films